Little Orton may refer to:
Little Orton, Cumbria
Little Orton, Leicestershire